Naked Willie is an album from American country music artist Willie Nelson. This album was released on March 17, 2009, on the Legacy Recordings label. The album include remixes of recordings from 1966–1970, stripped-down without orchestration or background vocals. The concept of the album is similar to the Beatles' Let It Be... Naked project released several years before Naked Willie. This album was released in some countries under the alternative title Stripped or Willie Stripped.

Track listing
All songs written by Willie Nelson except as noted.
 "Bring Me Sunshine" (Sylvia Dee, Arthur Kent) – 2:11
 "Following Me Around"  – 2:42
 "The Ghost"  – 2:34
 "Happiness Lives Next Door"  – 2:36
 "I Just Dropped By"  – 3:19
 "Jimmy's Road"  – 2:37
 "I Let My Mind Wander"  – 2:53
 "If You Could See What's Going Through My Mind"  – 2:55
 "Johnny One Time" (Dallas Frazier, A.L. Owens) – 2:48
 "The Local Memory"  – 1:50
 "The Party's Over"  – 2:26
 "Where Do You Stand"  – 2:10
 "When We Live Again"  – 2:15
 "What Can You Do To Me Now"  – 3:27
 "I'm A Memory"  – 2:29
 "Sunday Morning Coming Down" (Kris Kristofferson) – 5:50
 "Laying My Burdens Down"  – 3:01

Chart performance

External links
 Willie Nelson's Official Website
 Record Label
 Liner Notes: Mickey Rapahel on Willie Nelson's 'Naked Willie'
 MySpace Blogs

2009 remix albums
Willie Nelson remix albums